Grigory Dyomin was a Russian wrestler. He competed in the men's Greco-Roman middleweight at the 1908 Summer Olympics.

References

External links
 

Year of birth missing
Year of death missing
Russian male sport wrestlers
Olympic wrestlers of Russia
Wrestlers at the 1908 Summer Olympics
Place of birth missing